Sophia Lillis (born February 13, 2002) is an American actress. She is known for her role as Beverly Marsh in the horror films It (2017) and It: Chapter Two (2019), as well as her starring role as Sydney Novak in the Netflix drama series I Am Not Okay With This (2020). Lillis has also appeared in the HBO psychological thriller miniseries Sharp Objects (2018).

Career

Lillis made her film debut starring in the 2016 film 37. Previously, she had a minor role in Julie Taymor's stage production of William Shakespeare's A Midsummer Night's Dream, which was also filmed for live showings.

In 2017, she rose to prominence after co-starring as one of the lead characters, Beverly Marsh, in the horror film It, an adaptation of Stephen King's novel of the same name. Directed by Andy Muschietti, It also starred Jaeden Martell, Finn Wolfhard, Wyatt Oleff, Bill Skarsgård, Jack Dylan Grazer, Jeremy Ray Taylor and Chosen Jacobs. Later that year, she played one of Kristen Bell and Dax Shepard's children in Sia's music video "Santa's Coming for Us".

In 2018, Lillis appeared in the HBO television miniseries Sharp Objects, in which she played the younger version of Camille Preaker, played by Amy Adams as an adult. In 2019, Lillis starred as teenage sleuth Nancy Drew in the Warner Bros. film adaptation of Nancy Drew and The Hidden Staircase. While the film received mixed to positive reviews, Lillis's performance was singled out for praise. Later in 2019, she reprised her role as Beverly Marsh in It: Chapter Two.

In 2020, Lillis portrayed Gretel in Gretel & Hansel, a re-imagining of the German fairy tale "Hansel and Gretel". The film grossed $22 million worldwide against a budget of $5 million and received generally positive reviews from critics, who mostly praised the film for its acting and cinematography. The following month, Lillis played the lead role in the Netflix original series I Am Not Okay with This. Later that same year, she appeared with Paul Bettany in Uncle Frank, an independent film by True Blood and Six Feet Under creator Alan Ball, which premiered on Amazon Prime in November 2020.

Lillis is set to star alongside Naomi Watts in Claire McCarthy's The Burning Season. She will also appear in Before I Sleep. In March 2021, it was announced that Lillis would be appearing in Dungeons & Dragons: Honor Among Thieves. Lillis is part of an ensemble cast featuring actors Scarlett Johansson, Jeff Goldblum, and Tom Hanks, that will appear in the Wes Anderson film Asteroid City.

In October 2022, Lillis performed in Heroes of the Fourth Turning at Studio Theatre in Washington, DC.

Filmography

Film

Television

Music videos

Awards and nominations

References

External links 
 

Living people
American child actresses
American film actresses
American television actresses
21st-century American actresses
2002 births